is a conical hill in the town of Hiraizumi in southwestern Iwate Prefecture, Japan.  The mountain is part of the UNESCO World Heritage Site Historic Monuments and Sites of Hiraizumi.

Overview
Mount Kinkei is a sacred mountain that has influenced the spatial layout of the temple complex at Hiraizumi. It lies approximately halfway between the temples of Chuson-ji and Mōtsū-ji. According to the legend, the hill was built in a single night by Fujiwara no Hidehira of the Northern Fujiwara to the west of Muryōkō-in temple, which was intended to be a copy of the Byōdō-in temple in Uji (near Kyoto). The name of the hill is said to be derived from a golden cockerel was buried on the top.

In 1930, illegal excavations to find the legendary golden cockerel uncovered ceramic and earthenware and copper sutra containers, indicating that the summit of the hill was used as a sutra mound. The sutra containers are now at the Tokyo National Museum.

Subsequent excavations found the remains of a Hall identified as belonging to Zaō Gongen; associated with the cult of Miroku.

On 22 February 2005, Mount Kinkei was declared a national historic site.

Gallery

See also
 World Heritage Sites in Japan
List of Historic Sites of Japan (Iwate)

References

External links 

Hiraizumi's Cultural Heritage 
Hiraizumi Tourist Association

Mountains of Iwate Prefecture
World Heritage Sites in Japan
Historic Sites of Japan
Hiraizumi, Iwate
Mountains under 1000 metres